Burhanpur railway station is a main railway station in Burhanpur district, Madhya Pradesh. Its code is BAU. It serves Burhanpur city. The station consists of two platforms.

Popular culture
Indian-born Australian author Saroo Brierley became separated from his brother at this station after falling asleep on a decommissioned train heading to Kolkata, leading to a 25-year separation from his family. Brierley was later able to find his hometown and reunite with his mother by identifying the station on Google Earth, the subject of his book A Long Way Home and the 2016 film Lion.

Major trains 

Some of the important trains that runs from Burhanpur are:

 Sachkhand Express
 Dadadham Intercity Express
 Kolkata Mail
 Mangala Lakshadweep Express
 Pune–Danapur Superfast Express 
 Punjab Mail
 Karnataka Express
 Lashkar Express
 Bhagalpur–Lokmanya Tilak Terminus Superfast Express
 Jhelum Express
 Mumbai CST–Amritsar Express
 Mahanagari Express

References

External links 

Railway stations in Burhanpur district
Bhusawal railway division